Jamel Chatbi (born 30 April 1984) is a Moroccan-born athlete who specialises in the 3000 metres steeplechase and competes for Italy.

Biography
Based in Northern Italy, Chatbi began competing in 2006 and finished third in the Tutta Dritta 10km that year. He ran a new steeplechase best at the Mondo Keien Meeting in Uden, Netherlands, setting a new stadium record of 8:29.13.

He ran in the Campaccio cross country race and finished in eighth place. Chatbi attended the 2008 IAAF World Cross Country Championships, his first major event, and finished in 30th place, helping Morocco to fifth in the team rankings along with Abdellah Falil. He took part in the 2008 Parelloop race in Brunssum and finished in eleventh place with a new 10 km best of 28:33 minutes.

He improved significantly in 2009 and won his first major medal by setting a Games record and personal best of 8:13.11 for the gold in the steeplechase at the 2009 Mediterranean Games. At the 2009 World Championships in Athletics, he qualified for the final after finishing second in his heat behind eventual gold medallist Ezekiel Kemboi. However, he withdrew from the final after failing a mandatory drugs test, testing positive for clenbuterol. He was the first person to test positive at the championships. He received a three-year ban from competitive athletics lasting from 18 August 2009 until 17 September 2012.

See also
List of doping cases in athletics

References

External links
 

1984 births
Living people
Italian male cross country runners
Italian male steeplechase runners
Moroccan male steeplechase runners
Doping cases in athletics
Moroccan sportspeople in doping cases
Naturalised citizens of Italy
Italian sportspeople in doping cases
World Athletics Championships athletes for Morocco
World Athletics Championships athletes for Italy
Athletes (track and field) at the 2016 Summer Olympics
Olympic athletes of Italy
Mediterranean Games gold medalists for Morocco
Athletes (track and field) at the 2009 Mediterranean Games
Mediterranean Games medalists in athletics